Harjit Singh Sajjan  (born September 6, 1970) is a Canadian politician who has served as the minister of international development since October 26, 2021. A member of the Liberal Party, Sajjan represents the British Columbia (BC) riding of Vancouver South in the House of Commons, taking office as member of Parliament (MP) following the 2015 election. Sajjan served as the minister of national defence from 2015 to 2021. Before his entry into politics, Sajjan worked as a detective in the Vancouver Police Department and was a lieutenant-colonel in the Canadian Army. He is Canada's first Sikh minister of national defence, and was also the first Sikh Canadian to command a Canadian Army reserve regiment.

Early and personal life
Sajjan was born on September 6, 1970, in Bombeli, a village in the Hoshiarpur district of Punjab, India. Born into a Saini Sikh family.  His father, Kundan Sajjan, was a head constable with the Punjab Police in India, and is currently a member of the World Sikh Organization (WSO), a Sikh advocacy group. Sajjan, along with his mother and older sister, immigrated to Canada in 1976, when he was five years old, to join their father who had left for BC two years earlier to work at a sawmill. While the family was getting established in their new life in Canada, his mother worked on berry farms in BC Lower Mainland during the summer where Sajjan and his sister would frequently join her. Harjit Singh grew up in South Vancouver.

Sajjan married Kuljit Kaur, a family physician in 1996, and they have a son and a daughter, Arjun and Jeevut.

Sajjan was baptized as a Sikh when he was a teenager, seeing it as a way to get away from a bad crowd, such as his classmate Bindy Johal.

Military and police career 
Sajjan joined The British Columbia Regiment (Duke of Connaught's Own) in 1989 as a trooper and was commissioned as an officer in 1991. He eventually rose to the rank of lieutenant-colonel. He deployed overseas four times in the course of his career: once to Bosnia and Herzegovina, and three times to Afghanistan. Sajjan began his 11-year career as an officer of the Vancouver Police Department after returning from his Bosnian deployment. He ended his career with the Vancouver Police Department as a detective with the department's gang crimes unit specializing in drug trafficking and organized-crime investigation.

Sajjan's first deployment to Afghanistan was shortly before the start of Operation Medusa in 2006, during which he took leave from his work in the Vancouver Police Department's gang squad. He deployed with the 1st Battalion, Royal Canadian Regiment Battle Group in Kandahar and worked as a liaison officer with the Afghan police. Sajjan found that corruption in the Afghan government was driving recruitment to the Taliban. After reporting these findings to Brigadier General David Fraser, Sajjan was tasked with helping the general plan aspects of Operation Medusa.

Fraser evaluated Sajjan's leadership during the operation as "nothing short of brilliant". When Sajjan returned to Vancouver, Fraser sent a letter to the police department which called Sajjan "the best single Canadian intelligence asset in theatre", stated that his work saved "a multitude of coalition lives", and noted that the Canadian Forces should "seek his advice on how to change our entire tactical intelligence training and architecture". Sajjan was mentioned in dispatches for the usefulness of his tactical counterinsurgency knowledge in the planning and implementation of an unnamed operation in September 2006 to secure important terrain.

Upon his return, Sajjan left his position with the Vancouver police, but stayed as a reservist and started his own consulting business that taught intelligence gathering techniques to Canadian and American military personnel. He also consulted for US policy analyst and Afghanistan expert Barnett Rubin, which began as a correspondence over Sajjan's views on how to tackle the Afghan opium trade and evolved into a collaboration as advisers to American military and diplomatic leaders in Afghanistan.

Sajjan returned to Afghanistan for another tour of duty in 2009, taking another tour of leave from the Vancouver Police Department to do so. Having already taken two leaves of absence, Sajjan had to leave the Vancouver Police Department for his third tour of duty in 2010, during which he was assigned as a special assistant to then Major-General James L. Terry, the commander of American forces in Afghanistan.

In 2011, he became the first Sikh to command a Canadian Army reserve regiment when he was named commander of The British Columbia Regiment (Duke of Connaught's Own).

He was bestowed with the Meritorious Service Medal in 2012 for diluting the Taliban's influence in Kandahar Province. He has also been awarded the Canadian Peacekeeping Service Medal, the Order of Military Merit award, and served as Aide-de-Camp to the lieutenant governor of British Columbia.

His Sikh beliefs require him to keep his facial hair which prevents the use of regular military gas masks, so Sajjan invented his own gas mask that worked with his beard, and patented it in 1996.

Political career 

Sajjan was elected for the riding of Vancouver South during the 2015 federal election, defeating Conservative incumbent Wai Young. Sajjan was appointed minister of national defence in the federal Cabinet, headed by Justin Trudeau, on November 4, 2015. He was also briefly acting minister of veterans affairs in February 2019 following the resignation of Jody Wilson-Raybould, until the appointment of Lawrence MacAulay to the portfolio.

His alleged links with the Khalistan movement have caused diplomatic friction with Punjab's former chief minister, Amarinder Singh. Harjit Sajjan also has faced allegations from New Democratic Party (NDP) that he is "playing down his connections to the detainee controversy during the [Afghanistan] combat mission [Medusa], where Canadians handed over prisoners to torture by Afghan authorities."

In September 2019, Sajjan attended an event that was held to celebrate the 70th anniversary of the founding of the People's Republic of China, for which he was subsequently criticized by the Conservatives. A spokesperson for Sajjan said that he appeared in his capacity as a candidate for his riding and did not stay for long.

Controversy over role in Operation Medusa 
In an April 2017 public speech in New Delhi, Sajjan called himself "the architect" of Operation Medusa, a September 2006 Canadian offensive to remove Taliban fighters from around Kandahar. In July 2015, Sajjan had made the same claim during an episode of the BC program Conversations That Matter, stating that General Jonathan Vance, the chief of the defence staff at the time the story broke in 2017, saw him as "the architect" in the 2006 offensive. At the time of Operation Medusa, Sajjan was a major in the Canadian Army reserve and a liaison officer to Task Force Kandahar, where large combat operations such as Medusa were usually worked upon by generals and colonels.

One of the anonymous officers cited in the National Post, which first broke the story, called Sajjan's statement "a bald-faced lie", while others praised him on a personal level and for his expert intelligence work, but found his claim "really, quite outrageous" because the planning for Operation Medusa was collaborative. Canadian historian Jack Granatstein said that Sajjan was a skilled intelligence officer who would have presented important intelligence in the leadup to the operation, but that he "certainly wouldn't have been the chief planner". Granatstein said that while the mistake was not one that was worth resigning over, it would still hurt his relationship with the military. In an interview on AM640, Christopher Vernon, a British officer who served as chief of staff for NATO forces in Southern Afghanistan at Kandahar during Medusa, said that Sajjan's role in the planning was "more than integral" and that Sajjan was a "pivotal player" in the operation. Vernon noted that Sajjan had worked "hand-in-glove" with the Australian lieutenant colonel who was the lead planner and that without Sajjan's intelligence work, the operation would not have happened. Brigadier-General David Fraser had also extensively praised the indispensable nature of Sajjan's role in Operation Medusa.

Sajjan issued apologies in which he apologized to members of the Canadian Forces, the United States Armed Forces, and the Afghan Armed Forces in the operation, and noted that the successes of Operation Medusa were due to the contributions of all members of the Canadian Forces who were involved. Sajjan also acknowledged that describing himself as "the architect" was a mistake, and highlighted the role of Brigadier-General David Fraser in leading the team that planned the operation.

Sajjan was supported by Justin Trudeau amidst calls from the opposition for him to resign. A failed vote of no confidence in Sajjan was put forth by the Conservative Party of Canada in the House of Commons.

Sajjan was moved from minister of defence to minister of international development in an October 2021 cabinet reshuffle.

Honours and decorations

Sajjan has received the following honours and decorations during and after his military career.

100px

110px

Electoral record

References

External links

 Official Website
 Bio & mandate from the Prime Minister
 

1970 births
Canadian Army officers
Canadian Sikhs
Canadian politicians of Punjabi descent
Canadian police officers
Defence ministers of Canada
Indian emigrants to Canada
Liberal Party of Canada MPs
Living people
Members of the 29th Canadian Ministry
Members of the House of Commons of Canada from British Columbia
Members of the King's Privy Council for Canada
Officers of the Order of Military Merit (Canada)
People from Hoshiarpur district
Politicians from Vancouver
Recipients of the Meritorious Service Decoration
British Columbia Regiment (Duke of Connaught's Own)